Nayyerabad (also Romanized as Nayyerābād and Nīrābād) is a village in Rigestan Rural District, Zavareh District, Ardestan County, Isfahan Province, Iran. At the 2006 census, its population was 150, in 44 families.

References 

Populated places in Ardestan County